The Turkestan Legion was the name for the military units composed of the Turkic peoples who served in the Wehrmacht during World War II. Most of these troops were Red Army POWs who formed a common cause with the Germans (cf. Turkic, Caucasian, Cossack, and Crimean collaborationism with the Axis powers). Its establishment was spearheaded by Nuri Killigil, a Turkish theorist of Pan-Turkism, which sought to separate territories inhabited by Turkic peoples from their countries and eventually unite them under Turkish rule.

Although Turkic peoples had been perceived initially as "racially inferior" by the Nazis, this attitude officially already changed in autumn 1941, when, in view of the difficulties faced in their invasion of the Soviet Union, the Nazis attempted to harness the nationalist sentiment of Turkic peoples in the Soviet Union for political gain.

The first Turkestan Legion was mobilized in May 1942, originally consisting of only one battalion but expanded to 16 battalions and 16,000 soldiers by 1943. Under the Wehrmacht's command, these units were deployed exclusively on the Western Front in France and Italy, isolating them from contact with the Red Army.

The battalions of the Turkestan Legion formed part of the 162nd Infantry Division and saw much action in Axis-occupied Yugoslavia (especially modern-day Croatia) and Italy.

A large portion of the Turkestan Legion was captured by Allied forces and repatriated into the Soviet Union after the war's end, where they would face execution or incarceration by the Soviet government for having collaborated with the Nazis. Notable members of the legion include Baymirza Hayit, a Turkologist who after the war settled in West Germany and became an advocate for Pan-Turkist political causes.

Units 

 Turkestanisches Infanterie-Bataillon 450
 Turkestanisches Infanterie-Bataillon 452
 Turkestanisches Infanterie-Bataillon 781
 Turkestanisches Infanterie-Bataillon 782
 Turkestanisches Infanterie-Bataillon 783
 Turkestanisches Infanterie-Bataillon 784
 Turkestanisches Infanterie-Bataillon 785
 Turkestanisches Infanterie-Bataillon 786
 Turkestanisches Infanterie-Bataillon 787
 Turkestanisches Infanterie-Bataillon 788
 Turkestanisches Infanterie-Bataillon 789
 Turkestanisches Infanterie-Bataillon 790
 Turkestanisches Infanterie-Bataillon 791
 Turkestanisches Infanterie-Bataillon 792
 Turkestanisches Infanterie-Bataillon 793
 Turkestanisches Infanterie-Bataillon 794
 Turkestanisches Infanterie-Bataillon 811
 Turkestanisches Infanterie-Bataillon 839
 Turkestanisches Infanterie-Bataillon 840
 Turkestanisches Infanterie-Bataillon 841
 Turkestanisches Infanterie-Bataillon 842

See also
 Azerbaijani Legion
 Ostlegionen

References

Further reading

Central Asia
Foreign volunteer units of the Wehrmacht
History of Central Asia
Pan-Turkist organizations
Military units and formations established in 1942
Soviet collaborators with Nazi Germany